Farahnaz Ispahani is a Pakistani-American writer and former politician who served as member of the National Assembly of Pakistan between 2008 and 2012. She is a senior fellow at the Religious Freedom Institute and a member of the Anti-Defamation League Task Force on Middle East Minorities in Washington, D.C.

Personal life
She is married to Husain Haqqani and is the granddaughter of Abul Hassan Isphani.
She attended Wellesley College.

Professional career
As a journalist, she has worked with ABC News, CNN and MSNBC.

She is a writer and authored Purifying the Land of the Pure: Pakistan's Religious Minorities.

In 2012, Ispahani was named one of the Top 100 Global Thinkers by Foreign Policy. She was also named as Top 100 Women Who Matter the same year by Newsweek Pakistan.

From 2013 to 2014, she served as a Public Policy Scholar at the Woodrow Wilson International Center for Scholars.

Political career

She was elected to the National Assembly of Pakistan as a candidate of Pakistan Peoples Party on a seat reserved for women from Sindh in the 2008 Pakistani general election. During her tenure as Member of the National Assembly, she served as media advisor to President of Pakistan Asif Ali Zardari from 2008 until 2012 when her National Assembly membership was terminated on the basis of holding dual nationality.

Bibliography

References

External links 
Farahnaz Ispahani at HarperCollins India
Farahnaz Ispahani at DailyO.in
Farahnaz Ispahani at ThePrint

Living people
Year of birth missing (living people)
American women journalists
Pakistan People's Party MNAs
Pakistani MNAs 2008–2013
Women members of the National Assembly of Pakistan
Pakistani emigrants to the United States
Farahnaz
Expelled members of the National Assembly of Pakistan
People with acquired American citizenship
21st-century Pakistani women politicians
21st-century American women
Pakistani people of Iranian descent